Eric Scott (born Eric Scott Magat; October 20, 1958, in Los Angeles, California, United States) is an American actor whose best known role is as Ben Walton, which he first played in the television film The Homecoming: A Christmas Story (1971), and in the series it inspired, The Waltons.

He was briefly married to actress Karey Louis. His second marriage was to Theresa Fargo, the mother of his daughter Ashley, until her death from acute myelomonocytic leukemia on November 5, 1992, not long after Ashley's birth. She had developed the disease during her pregnancy.

In March 2000, Scott married Cynthia (Cindy) Ullman Wolfen. They have a daughter, Emma, born in 2001, and a son, Jeremy, who was born in 2004.

Today, Scott owns Chase Messengers, a parcel delivery service, in Encino, California.

Filmography

1970s
The Homecoming: A Christmas Story (1971)
Medical Center (1971)
Bewitched (1971)
The Waltons (1972–1981)
Which Mother Is Mine? (1979)
Family Feud (1979)

1980s
The Loch Ness Horror (1981)
A Day for Thanks on Walton's Mountain (1982)
Mother's Day on Waltons Mountain (1982)
A Wedding on Walton's Mountain (1982)
The Fall Guy (1985)

1990s
A Walton Thanksgiving Reunion (1993)
A Walton Wedding (1995)
Defying Gravity (1997)
A Walton Easter (1997)

2000s
TV total (2004)

References

External links

American male actors
1958 births
Living people
The Waltons